In England, Wales and Northern Ireland, the Diploma in Digital Applications (DiDA) is an optional information and communication technology (ICT) course, usually studied by Key Stage 4 or equivalent school students (aged 14-16). DiDA was introduced in 2005 (after a pilot starting in 2004) as a creation of the Edexcel examination board. DiDA is notable in that it consists entirely of coursework, completed on-computer; all work relating to the DiDA course is created, stored, assessed and moderated digitally. It was introduced as a replacement to plug the gap in ICT education as GNVQs were withdrawn.

Course

There are two particular 'levels' that can be taken: Level 1 (Grades C-G) and Level 2 (Grades A* - C). The course consists of five units. Using ICT is a compulsory unit. The other four units, Multimedia, Graphics, ICT in Enterprise and Computer Games Authoring.

Students who complete the Using ICT module alone receive an Award in Digital Applications (AiDA), which is equivalent to one GCSE or Standard Grade. Those who complete the Using ICT unit and any one of the other four units receive a Certificate in Digital Applications (CiDA), which is equivalent to two GCSEs or Standard Grades. Students who complete four modules receive the full Diploma in Digital Applications (DiDA), which is equivalent to four GCSEs or Standard Grades. Edexcel also made it possible for candidates to achieve a Certificate in Digital Applications Plus (CiDA+), equivalent to three GCSEs or Standard Grades, upon completion of Using ICT and another two units. 

Each module is stated to take approximately 30 guided learning hours to complete. Pupils completing any module of the DiDA course do so by reading an online web resource (see external links) and then independently completing a set number of tasks. These tasks, as well as the planning and design work, are presented in an 'eportfolio' to be marked and assessed. Only work presented on a computer is marked.
 
Edexcel maintains an archive of the previous modules (known as Summative Project Briefs, or simply SPBs) online, so candidates have the opportunity to practice working to meet the requirements of the course, and so teachers can practice leading the course.

Levelling & qualifications
In DiDA students can get one of five grades. These are: fail, pass, credit, merit and distinction at both levels one and two. 

The Games Authoring module is a new addition in the September 2009 Summative Project Briefs.

Adobe Associate Certificates 
Students who successfully complete DiDA units D202 and D203 are eligible to claim Adobe Associate Certification. Adobe has now launched a new suite of Adobe Certified Associate qualifications, examinations for which are managed by Certiport.

Students will be eligible to claim Adobe Systems Associate Certificate(s) (formerly known as Macromedia Certificates, before Adobe purchased Macromedia) if they achieve a merit or distinction in the relevant unit at Level 2 and complete the Adobe Associate Certificate tasks, using the relevant Adobe software, as part of the Summative Project Briefs for the following units:

Web Media using Dreamweaver - Multimedia
Multimedia using Flash - Multimedia
Web Graphics using Fireworks - Graphics

This scheme has now been cancelled, leaving many unhappy students without extra qualifications, however an alternative has been provided by Certiport and Edexcel, with much more work.

An alternative to Adobe is the MatchWare DiDA Suite (OpenMind, Mediator 9, ScreenCorder 5) which is endorsed by Edexcel. Students can create ePortfolios and advanced Multimedia projects appropriate for D201 and D202.

References

External links
 Edexcel: DiDA
 DiDA SPB (Using ICT from 2006)
 DiDA SPB (Multimedia from 2006)
http://www1.edexcel.org.uk/D203_SPB_0911_FINAL/html/SPB203Index.htm (Graphics from 2011)]
 DiDA SPB (ICT in Enterprise from 2006)
 DiDA ePortfolio-builder
 Website dedicated to the DiDA course
 Requirements for Adobe certification

Educational qualifications in the United Kingdom
Information technology in the United Kingdom
Information technology qualifications